This is a record of the seasons played by Motherwell Football Club in Scottish and European competition from 1891 to the present day. It details the club's achievements in major competitions, and details all the managers of Motherwell.

This list does not include matches from the Lanarkshire Cup.

Seasons

Key

Key to league record
Pld = Played
W = Games won
D = Games drawn
L = Games lost
GF = Goals for
GA = Goals against
GD = Goal difference
Pts = Points
FP = Final position
Key to tier
U = Unknown

Key to rounds
PR = Preliminary Round
QR3 = Qualifying Round 3
PO = Play-Off match
R1 = Round 1
R2 = Round 2
R3 = Round 3
R4 = Round 4
R5 = Round 5
R6 = Round 6
GS = Group Stage
QF = Quarter-finals
SF = Semi-finals
RU = Runners-up
W  = Winners

Notes

References

External links 
 Motherwell F.C. Club History
 Scottish Football Historical Archive
 Scottish Football History website
 League Archive
 Cup Archive
 Soccerbase

Seasons
 
Motherwell
Seasons